Dooish (Irish: Dubhais (Black hill-base) is a village and townland near Drumquin in County Tyrone, Northern Ireland. The townland is situated in the historic barony of Omagh West and the civil parish of Longfield West and covers an area of 845 acres. In the 2001 Census it had a population of 93 people. It lies within the Omagh District Council area.

The population of the townland declined during the 19th century:

See also
List of townlands of County Tyrone

References

NI Neighbourhood Information System

Villages in County Tyrone
Townlands of County Tyrone
Civil parish of Longfield West